Podboršt pri Komendi is a settlement immediately north of Komenda in the Upper Carniola region of Slovenia.

Name
The name of the settlement was changed from Podboršt to Podboršt pri Komendi in 1953.

References

External links

Podboršt pri Komendi on Geopedia

Populated places in the Municipality of Komenda